Verchères was a federal electoral district in Quebec, Canada, that was represented in the House of Commons of Canada from 1867 to 1892, and from 1988 to 1997.

The first Verchères electoral district was created in the British North America Act, 1867, and abolished in 1892 when it was merged into Chambly riding. It covered the area bounded on the northeast by the County of Richelieu, on the northwest by the Saint Lawrence River, on the southeast by the Richelieu River, and on the southwest by the southeastern limits of the Parishes of Chambly, Saint Bruno and Boucherville, including all islands in the Saint Lawrence and Richelieu Rivers nearest to Verchères and wholly or in part opposite to it. Verchères comprised, therefore, the Parishes of Varennes, Verchères, Contrecoeur, Beloeil, Saint Marc, Saint Antoine and Sainte Julie.

The second Verchères electoral district was created in 1976. In 1998, the name of the riding was changed to "Verchères—Les Patriotes".  See that article for information on the riding created in 1976.

Members of Parliament

This riding elected the following Members of Parliament:

Election results

By-Election on Mr. Geoffrion being appointed Minister of Inland Revenue:

|- 
  
|Liberal
|Félix Geoffrion
|colspan=3 align="center"|acclaimed

By-Election on Mr. Geoffrion's death:

|- 
  
|Liberal
|Christophe-Alphonse Geoffrion
|colspan=3 align="center"|acclaimed

See also 

 List of Canadian federal electoral districts
 Past Canadian electoral districts

References

External links 
 Riding history from the Library of Parliament

Former federal electoral districts of Quebec
Varennes, Quebec